Diffusive–thermal instability or thermo–diffusive instability is an instrinsic flame instability that occurs both in premixed flames and in diffusion flames and arises because of the difference in the diffusion coefficient values for the fuel and heat transport, characterized by non-unity values of Lewis numbers. The instability mechanism that arises here is the same as in Turing instability explaining chemical morphogenesis, although the mechanism was first discovered in the context of combustion by Yakov Zeldovich in 1944 to explain the cellular structures appearing in lean hydrogen flames. Quantitative stability theory for premixed flames were developed by Gregory Sivashinsky (1977), Guy Joulin and Paul Clavin (1979) and for diffusion flames by Jong S. Kim (1997).

Dispersion relation for premixed flames

To neglect the influences by hydrodynamic instabilities such as Darrieus–Landau instability, Rayleigh–Taylor instability etc., the analysis usually neglects effects due to the thermal expansion of the gas mixture by assuming a constant density model. Such an approximation is referred to as diffusive-thermal approximation or thermo-diffusive approximation which was first introudced by Grigory Barenblatt, Yakov Zeldovich and A. G. Istratov in 1962.

The stability margins are given by the following equations

describing two curves in the vs. plane. The first curve is associated with condition , whereas on the second curve  The first curve separates the region of stable mode from the region corresponding to cellular instability, whereas the second condition indicates the presence of traveling and/or pulsating instability.

See also
Turing pattern
Darrieus–Landau instability
Kuramoto–Sivashinsky equation
Double diffusive convection

References

Fluid dynamics
Combustion
Fluid dynamic instabilities